Sha'Carri Richardson (born March 25, 2000) is an American track and field sprinter who competes in the 100 meters and 200 meters. Richardson rose to fame in 2019 as a freshman at Louisiana State University, running 10.75 seconds to break the 100 m record at the National Collegiate Athletic Association (NCAA) Championships. This winning time made her one of the ten fastest women in history at 19 years old.

In April 2021, Richardson ran a new personal best of 10.72 seconds, becoming the sixth fastest woman of all time (at the time) and the fourth-fastest American woman in history. She qualified for the 2020 Summer Olympics after winning the women's 100-meter dash with 10.86 in the United States Olympic Trials. On July 1, it was reported that Richardson had tested positive for cannabis use following her 100 m final at the U.S. Trials, invalidating her win and making her ineligible to compete in the 100 m at the Olympics. After successfully completing a counseling program, she accepted a one-month period of ineligibility that began on June 28, 2021.

Career
As a teenager, she won the 100 m title at the AAU Junior Olympics—the largest national multi-sport event for youth in the United States—in 2016, then another title at the USATF Junior Olympics in 2017. She made her international debut at the 2017 Pan American U20 Athletics Championships, where she won a gold medal in the 4 × 100-meter relay alongside Gabriele Cunningham, Rebekah Smith, and Tara Davis. She enrolled at Louisiana State University and began competing for the LSU Lady Tigers track and field team. Competing as a college athlete, she was a finalist in both the 60-meter dash and the 200 m the 2019 NCAA Division I Indoor Track and Field Championships.

At the 2019 NCAA Division I Outdoor Track and Field Championships she won the 100 m and placed runner-up in the 200 m by less than one hundredth of a second. Both her times were world under-20 records for the sprints. Her NCAA performance, which also included second in the 4 × 100 m relay, was the second best ever by a female sprinter, after Merlene Ottey.

Four days after the NCAA Championships, she announced she would forgo collegiate eligibility after her first year, and sign a professional contract. She trains with former Olympic sprinter Dennis Mitchell and is sponsored by Nike.

Tokyo Olympics and suspension

Richardson qualified for the 2020 Summer Olympics with a 100-meter time of 10.86 seconds at the 2020 United States Olympic Trials. It was 0.13 seconds faster than Javianne Oliver, who finished second. A urine sample that she submitted tested positive for THC metabolites, however, indicating recent cannabis use and putting her participation in the Olympics in doubt. After successfully completing a counseling program, she accepted a one-month suspension by the United States Anti-Doping Agency (USADA) that began on June 28, 2021. While Richardson was ineligible for the Olympic 100 meters due to the suspension ending on July 27, 2021, she could have been eligible for the Women's 4 × 100 relay scheduled for August 5, 2021. However, she was not selected, thereby missing the Olympics entirely.

Richardson stated that she took the drug to cope with the pressure of qualifying for the Olympics while mourning the recent death of her biological mother. Her suspension was criticized by many individuals and organizations in favor of liberalizing cannabis policies, including NORML, members of the Congressional Cannabis Caucus, and other members of Congress. U.S. President Joe Biden also suggested that drug testing rules governing athletes could be changed. USADA responded to the criticism by pointing out that as a signatory to the World Anti-Doping Code, it has an obligation to enforce it in the United States. Furthermore, they stated that changing those rules might be problematic, as the vast majority of world’s nation states consider consuming marijuana a criminal offense. In response to the controversy, in September 2021, the World Anti-Doping Agency announced that it would conduct a review regarding the prohibited status of cannabis. Cannabis has remained a prohibited drug for Olympic athletes since 1999, though in 2013 the World Anti-Doping Agency increased the level of THC metabolite allowed from 15 ng/mL to 150 ng/mL.

Richardson returned to the track at the 2021 Prefontaine Classic, placing ninth – last place – with a time of 11.14 seconds. The Tokyo medalists, Jamaicans Elaine Thompson-Herah, Shelly-Ann Fraser-Pryce and Shericka Jackson, repeated their placements.

Personal life
Richardson was raised by her grandmother Betty Harp and an aunt. 

In 2021, a week before Richardson's qualifying race for the 2020 Summer Olympics, her biological mother died.  Richardson knew nothing of her biological mother's passing until she was asked about it by a reporter. 

Richardson is noted for her long nails and her colorful hair on the field, and has stated that her style is inspired by that of American track and field athlete Florence Griffith Joyner.

In 2021, Richardson stated that she has a girlfriend. She gave a Twitter shout-out to the LGBTQ community immediately after her win in June 2021.

On January 23, 2023, Richardson was removed from an American Airlines flight following an argument with a flight attendant.

International competitions

National titles
NCAA Division I Women's Outdoor Track and Field Championships
100 m: 2019
AAU Junior Olympics
100 m: 2016, 2017

See also
 2019 in 100 metres
 2020 in 100 metres

References

External links
 
 
 
 SHA'CARRI RICHARDSON profile LSU Tigers track and field
 SHA'CARRI RICHARDSON TRACK AND FIELD profile Team USA

2000 births
African-American female track and field athletes
American female sprinters
LGBT African Americans
LGBT track and field athletes
LGBT people from Texas
American LGBT sportspeople
Lesbian sportswomen
Living people
LSU Lady Tigers track and field athletes
Track and field athletes from Dallas
United States collegiate record holders in athletics (track and field)
USA Outdoor Track and Field Championships winners
2021 in cannabis
21st-century African-American sportspeople
21st-century African-American women
20th-century African-American sportspeople
20th-century African-American women